Orohippus (from the Greek  , 'mountain' and  , 'horse') is an extinct equid that lived in the Eocene (about 50 million years ago).

 
It is believed to have evolved from equids such as Eohippus, as the earliest evidence for Orohippus appears about 2 million years after the first appearance of Eohippus. The anatomical differences between the two are slight: they were the same size, but Orohippus had a slimmer body, a more elongated head, slimmer forelimbs and longer hind legs, all of which are characteristics of a good jumper. Its teeth were brachydont in height, but the development of flattened surfaces and shearing lophs on their molars suggests they were more a browser than a frugivore. The outer toes of Eohippus are no longer present in Orohippus, hence on each forelimb there were four fingers (toes) and on each hind leg three toes.

Species of Orohippus has also been referred to Protorohippus.

See also

 Evolution of the horse
 Horse

Notes

References
 MacFadden, B.J., 1998. Equidae. pp. 537–559 in C.M. Janis, K.M. Scott, and L.L. Jacobs (eds.) Evolution of Tertiary Mammals of North America Cambridge University Press, Cambridge.
 Orohippus, Index Fossils and the Tertiary
 The Evolution of the Horse
 National Center for Science Education

Eocene horses
Eocene odd-toed ungulates
Eocene mammals of North America
Paleogene United States
Prehistoric placental genera
Extinct mammals of North America
Eocene genus first appearances
Eocene genus extinctions
Fossil taxa described in 1872